Aye Zindagi is a 2015 Pakistani television serial, directed by Adnan Wai Qureshi, produced by Mehroz Karim and aired on Hum TV. It first aired on 12 March 2015. The story focuses on the issues related to adoption and revolves around a family who adopts a boy from their relatives.

Plot 
The story revolves around the family of Mr. Hamid who lives with his wife Saba, three daughters Samra, Nimra and Vashma and adopted son Taimoor. Saba loves Taimoor more than her daughters and prioritises him. This unjust behaviour bothers Nimra, she protests against it to her mother but she pays no ears on it.

Cast 
 Affan Waheed as Taimoor
 Sidra Batool as Nimra
 Zarnish Khan as Samra
 Sakina Samo as Saba
 Manzoor Qureshi as Hamid
 Jinaan Hussain as Alina
 Hassan Ahmed as Ashar
 Hassan Niazi as Adeel
 Shamim Hilaly as Sultana
 Mazhar Ali as Jalal
 Khalid Ahmed
 Nida Mumtaz as Amma
 Mohsin Gillani
 Ali Abbas

Soundtrack 
The official soundtrack of the serial was performed by Quratulain Balouch. It marked her return to the channel since she performed the OST of Roshan Sitara in 2012. The music was composed by Waqar Ali while all the lyrics were written by Asma Nabeel. The soundtrack along with the serial was co-produced by Moomal Shunaid and Mehroz Karim.

Awards and nominations 
 Hum Awards - Zarnish Khan - Best Supporting Actor-Female - Nominated

References

External links 
 Official website
 

Pakistani television series